Steven (Steve) Bramson is a professional composer who has been nominated for two Primetime Emmy Awards, and has won one Daytime Emmy Award and three ASCAP Awards. He has written music to George Lucas' Young Indiana Jones  and the CBS series JAG. Bramson's music has been played in New York City, London and Vienna.  He is currently writing a musical titled Shimmy. The lyrics are being credited to Pamela Phillips Oland.  Although he once considered being an economist, Steve is also an excellent jazz pianist, who has backed up major jazz stars and once played in the Montreux Jazz Festival.

Filmography
In Enemy Hands
Yogi the Easter Bear
Adventures in Animation 3D
Scooby-Doo on Zombie Island
Casualties
The Crude Oasis
Don McKay
Decoding Annie Parker
Dominion

Television credits
Tiger Cruise
Navy NCIS
JAG
The Young Indiana Jones Chronicles
Love Can Be Murder
Tiny Toon Adventures ("Psychic Fun-omenon Day", "Hero Hamton", "How Sweetie It Is", "Henny Youngman Day" and "The Horror of Slumber Party Mountain")
Jake and the Fatman
Journeyman
The Nine

Musicals
Shimmy

Theme park attractions
De la Terre à la Lune - the synchronized on-board audio theme used for the original version of Space Mountain in Disneyland Paris, named Space Mountain: De la Terre à la Lune  from 1995 - 2005.

External links

Interview with Steven Bramson (The Daily Film Music Blog) 

American film score composers
American male film score composers
American television composers
Living people
Year of birth missing (living people)